The 2015 Amgen Tour of California Women's Race p/b SRAM was the first edition of the Tour of California women's race, held between 8 and 10 May in California, with a UCI rating of 2.1.

Teams
Fourteen teams were announced for the race in February 2015.

UCI women's teams

Elite teams

UAEM-G Pro Cycling Team

National team
Canada

Stages

Stage 1
May 8, 2015 — South Lake Tahoe to Heavenly Mountain Resort,

Stage 2
May 9, 2015 — South Lake Tahoe to Heavenly Mountain Resort,

Stage 3
May 10, 2015 — Sacramento to Sacramento,

Classification leadership

References

women
Tour of California
Tour of California
Tour of California
Women's sports in California